The Neptune Range is a mountain range,  long, lying WSW of Forrestal Range in the central part of the Pensacola Mountains in Antarctica. The range is composed of Washington Escarpment with its associated ridges, valleys and peaks, the Iroquois Plateau, and the Schmidt and Williams Hills. It was discovered and photographed on 13 January 1956 on a US Navy transcontinental plane flight from McMurdo Sound to Weddell Sea and return.

Named by US-ACAN after the Navy 2V-2N Neptune aircraft with which this flight was made. The entire Pensacola Mountains were mapped by USGS in 1967 and 1968 from ground surveys and United States Navy tricamera aerial photographs taken in 1964.

Key mountains 
 Astro Peak is a peak, 835 m, standing 1 mile (1.6 km) off the west end of Berquist Ridge. So named by US-ACAN because the USGS established an astro control station on this peak during the 1965-66 season.
 Mount Dasinger is a mountain, 1,360 m, standing 6 nautical miles (11 km) northeast of Neith Nunatak in northern Neptune Range. Mapped by USGS from surveys and U.S. Navy air photos, 1956-66. Named by US-ACAN for Lieutenant (j.g.) James R. Dasinger, U.S. Navy, of the Ellsworth Station winter party, 1958.
 Mount Torbert is a prominent, pyramidal rock peak, 1,675 m, midway along Torbert Escarpment in the Neptune Range. Discovered and photographed on January 13, 1956 on the transcontinental nonstop plane flight by personnel of U.S. Navy Operation Deep Freeze I from McMurdo Sound to Weddell Sea and return. Named by US-ACAN for Lieutenant Commander John H. Torbert, U.S. Navy, pilot of the aircraft making this flight.

Key geographical features 
 Gillies Rock is an isolated rock lying 6 nautical miles (11 km) north of Mount Dasinger. Mapped by USGS from surveys and U.S. Navy air photos, 1956-66. Named by US-ACAN for Betty Gillies, ham radio operator of San Diego, CA, who for several seasons from 1960-70 arranged phone patches for members of USGS field parties in the Thiel Mountains, Pensacola Mountains, and elsewhere in Antarctica.

Features
Geographical features include:

Williams Hills

Schmidt Hills

Other features

 Baker Ridge
 Barnes Icefalls
 Bennett Spires
 Berquist Ridge
 Brown Ridge
 Childs Glacier
 Drury Ridge
 Elbow Peak
 Elliott Ridge
 Elmers Nunatak
 Final Rock
 Foundation Ice Stream
 Gale Ridge
 Gambacorta Peak
 Hannah Ridge
 Heiser Ridge
 Hill Nunatak
 Hinckley Rock
 Hudson Ridge
 Jones Valley
 Kaminski Nunatak
 Kinsella Peak
 Loren Nunataks
 Madey Ridge
 Meads Peak
 Median Snowfield
 Miller Valley
 Mount Bragg
 Mount Cowart
 Mount Dover
 Mount Ege
 Mount Feldkotter
 Mount Hawkes
 Mount Kaschak
 Mount Moffat
 Neith Nunatak
 Nelson Peak
 Patrick Nunatak
 Ramsey Cliff
 Rivas Peaks
 Seay Nunatak
 Seely Ridge
 Serpan Peak
 Spanley Rocks
 Torbert Escarpment
 Washington Escarpment
 Webb Nunataks
 West Prongs
 Wiens Peak

References

Mountain ranges of Queen Elizabeth Land
.
Transantarctic Mountains